Melian reliefs were produced on the island of Milos from about 470 to 416 BC. Most of them were found on this island. Details were once painted, but the paint is now most often gone. They show most often narrative subjects from Greek mythology. They were perhaps made for wooden boxes Another option is, that they were placed on walls. providing an inexpensive imitation for reliefs made in more expensive materials, such as ivory. Many of them show holes for an attachment.

In 416 BC, Milos was ransacked by Athens in the Peloponnesian War. The population was sold into slavery. This is most likely the end of the production of the Melian reliefs.

References

External links

Melian Relief, Louvre
Relief plaque

5th-century BC Greek art
Ancient Greek sculpture